"With God on Our Side" is a song by Bob Dylan, released as the third track on his 1964 album The Times They Are A-Changin'. Dylan first performed the song during his debut at The Town Hall in New York City on April 12, 1963.

Lyrics
The lyrics address the tendency of Americans to believe that God will invariably side with them and oppose those with whom they disagree, thus leaving unquestioned the morality of wars fought and atrocities committed by their country. Dylan mentions several  historical events, including the slaughter of Native Americans in the nineteenth century, the Spanish–American War, the American Civil War, World Wars I and II, The Holocaust, the Cold War and the betrayal of Jesus Christ by Judas Iscariot.

Dylan added an additional verse about the Vietnam War for live versions in the 1980s (one which was recorded by The Neville Brothers) that ran thus:

The words from the song "whether Judas Iscariot had God on his side" inspired Tim Rice to write the lyrics of Jesus Christ Superstar from Judas's perspective.

Controversy concerning plagiarism
The melody of "With God on Our Side" is essentially identical to the traditional Irish folk song "The Merry Month of May", which was also used by Dominic Behan in his song "The Patriot Game".  The opening verse is also similar to the second verse of Behan's song, in which the narrator gives his name and age.  Behan criticized Dylan publicly by claiming the melody as an original composition. Behan took the view that the provenance of Dylan's entire body of work must be questioned. Behan exercised the same folk tradition as Dylan in writing the song, having himself borrowed the melody.

Incidents of censorship

In a 1984 interview with David Barsamian, Anthony B. Herbert reported that while serving in the US Army during the Vietnam War, he was asked by a general to stop playing a record containing Joan Baez's version of "With God on Our Side", with the general describing Baez as "anti-military".

Live recordings

Dylan and Joan Baez performed the song as a duet at the Newport Folk Festival in July 1963 and July 1964, and their July 27, 1963 performance was released on Newport Broadside: Topical Songs at the Newport Folk Festival 1963 (Vanguard VSD-79144). The liner notes by Stacy Williams mention Dominic Behan's "Patriot Game", which Williams points out that Behan had borrowed from the traditional "The Merry Month of May". Another live recording of Dylan and Baez performing "With God on Our Side", recorded on October 31, 1964, can be found on the album The Bootleg Series Vol. 6: Bob Dylan Live 1964, Concert at Philharmonic Hall, released in 2004.

A rare post-1960s performance of the song, recorded on November 4, 1975, with extra lyrics, was included on the bonus disc in the box set The Rolling Thunder Revue: The 1975 Live Recordings (2019). Conversely, Dylan's performance of the song on the album Bob Dylan Unplugged, released in 1995, significantly omits verses about the Germans and the Holocaust, and the Russians and the Cold War.

Use in films and documentaries
"With God on Our Side" plays over the closing credits of two films, Oren Jacoby's 2007 documentary on anti-Semitism, Constantine's Sword, and Oliver Stone's 2008 biography of George W. Bush, W.
Used several times in Ken Burns' The Vietnam War. 
K'naan's version of the song was used during the ending credits in Michael Moore's 2018 film Fahrenheit 11/9.

Covers
 Manfred Mann used it as the second song on the B-side of their EP The One in the Middle because, according to the record's liner notes, Dylan had attended a gig and declared them "real groovy".
 Straylight Run covered the song on their Prepare to Be Wrong EP.
 San Francisco-based alternative rock band Wire Train recorded the song as "God On Our Side" for their 1985 album Between Two Words, and the recording appears on their compilation "Last Perfect Thing."
 The 2012 compilation album Chimes of Freedom features a version by Canadian musician K'Naan with verses reflecting the singer's upbringing in Somalia.

See also
List of anti-war songs

Notes

References

Herbert, Anthony B. 1984. "The Vietnam War: Atrocities and Coverups"  (Program #HERA002. Recorded in Boulder, Colorado on August 12, 1984) https://www.alternativeradio.org/products/hera002

Songs written by Bob Dylan
Bob Dylan songs
1964 songs
Joan Baez songs
Anti-war songs
Folk rock songs
Song recordings produced by Tom Wilson (record producer)